The Bolivian passport is the official travel document issued to citizens of Bolivia by the Bolivian Government through its specially appointed office, Dirección General de Migración (General Office of Migration). The document can also be extended abroad via consulate representatives. 

The current passport has undergone several modifications following international regulations as well as other regarding naming and adherence to international organisations, like the Andean Community of Nations. In an official press release the General Office on Migration details 18 safety measures including the costs and other details of the new passport which now complies with international regulations for mechanical and biometric readings.

Gallery of historic passports

See also
 Andean passport
 Visa policy of Bolivia
 Visa requirements for Bolivian citizens

References

External links
Images of a 1984 Bolivian passport

Bolivia
Government of Bolivia